The .14-222 is a wildcat cartridge that was created in 1985 by Helmut W. Sakschek. It uses a .222 Remington case necked down to accept a .14 caliber bullet.

See also 

 List of rifle cartridges

References 

 

Pistol and rifle cartridges
Wildcat cartridges